Léandre et Héro (Leander and Hero) is an opera by the French composer the Marquis de Brassac, first performed at the Académie Royale de Musique (the Paris Opera) on 25 April (or the 5 May) 1750. It takes the form of a tragédie en musique in a prologue and five acts. The libretto, by Jean-Jacques Lefranc, Marquis de Pompignan, is based on the Greek legend of Hero and Leander.

Notes and references

Sources
 Libretto at "Livres baroques"
 Félix Clément and Pierre Larousse Dictionnaire des Opéras, Paris, 1881,  page 398.

French-language operas
Tragédies en musique
Operas
1750 operas